Star Milling and Electric Company Historic District, also known as Star Mill Falls and Star Gristmill, is a historic industrial complex and national historic district located in Lima Township, LaGrange County, Indiana.  The district encompasses one contributing building, one contributing site, and two contributing structures.  They are a small hydroelectric powerhouse (1929), two dams (1929), and the site of the original 1870 grist mill / hydroelectric generating plant. The old mill generated electric power from 1911 to 1929, and in 1930 the new powerhouse began operation.

It was listed in the National Register of Historic Places in 1995.

References

Grinding mills in Indiana
Historic districts on the National Register of Historic Places in Indiana
Grinding mills on the National Register of Historic Places in Indiana
Industrial buildings completed in 1929
Buildings and structures in LaGrange County, Indiana
National Register of Historic Places in LaGrange County, Indiana